The Johannesburg trolleybus system was part of the public transport network in Johannesburg, South Africa, for nearly 50 years in the mid-twentieth century.

History

See also
James Hall Transport Museum
History of Johannesburg
List of trolleybus systems

References

Further reading
 Broken link

External links

Flickr image of a Johannesburg trolleybus, 1968
Flickr image of a Johannesburg trolleybus, 1984

Transport in Johannesburg
Johannesburg
Johannesburg